Orane Simpson (4 September 1983 – 13 October 2009) was a Jamaican footballer.

Club career 
Simpson began his professional career with Tivoli Gardens F.C., and scored the winning goal in a final round victory over Arnett Gardens F.C. to lead the club to the 2009 Jamaica National Premier League title.

International career 
Simpson made a few appearances for the Jamaica national football team in friendlies that were part of the build-up to the 2009 CONCACAF Gold Cup.

Death 
Simpson was attacked and stabbed to death in Kingston, Jamaica, on 13 October 2009. Before the kick-off of each Jamaica league game on Sunday 18 October, a minute of silence was observed in his memory.

References

1983 births
2009 deaths
Sportspeople from Kingston, Jamaica
Jamaican footballers
Jamaica international footballers
Jamaican murder victims
Male murder victims
People murdered in Jamaica
Deaths by stabbing in Jamaica
Tivoli Gardens F.C. players
Association football midfielders
2009 murders in North America